The Volkswagen Passat (B2) is an automobile which was produced by German manufacturer Volkswagen from 1981 to 1988. It was the second generation of the Volkswagen Passat. The platform was slightly longer than the preceding Passat (B1). As with the previous generation, it was based on the platform of the Audi 80; the corresponding B2 version of which had been already launched in 1978. The Santana was also manufactured in China, Brazil, Mexico (as the Corsar, from 1984 and 1988) and Argentina (as the Carat between 1987 and 1991). In Brazil, the Santana station wagon was sold as the Quantum. In the United States, both the Santana sedan and station wagon were sold as the Quantum. The Passat saloon and estate were produced in South Africa for their local market until 1987. The production of Passat B2 in China ended in 2013.

History
Body configurations for the Passat B2 included hatchback, Variant (estate/wagon), and a three-box saloon which, until the 1985 facelift, was marketed as the Volkswagen Santana in Europe. In most markets, the equipment levels were renamed from L/LS/GLS to CL/GL/CD. The four-wheel drive Syncro Variant was introduced in April 1984, initially only with the 2-litre five-cylinder engine. In August, the more powerful 2.2-litre option was added.

Like the previous generation, the B2 Passat was mainly sold with four-cylinder petrol and diesel engines. Unlike its predecessor, however, top-of the line versions received five-cylinder Audi or VW engines of 1.9–2.2 litres. In addition to four- and five-speed manuals and three-speed automatic gearboxes, the Passat/Santana was also available with the Volkswagen concern's interesting 4+E transmission. This, also called the "Formel E", had an overdrive fourth and an even taller fifth gear, which combined with a freewheeling mechanism to provide better gas mileage but less impressive performance. Originally, this was the only five-speed transmission offered with the Passat B2. An automatic stop/start was also available in some markets.

The four-wheel drive system used in the Passat Variant Syncro shared the mechanics of the Audi 80 quattro rather than the Volkswagen Golf Syncro. When first shown, at the 1983 Frankfurt Motor Show, the car was meant to be called the "Passat Tetra". The Syncro's bottom plate was almost entirely different, requiring a transmission tunnel, a relocated gas tank, and no spare tire well (to make room for the complex rear axle assembly). Unlike the related Audi 80 quattro which used a reversed front wheel setup, the rear-axle was an adapted Volkswagen Transporter unit which enabled retaining a flat loading floor. Only the more popular estate was deemed worthy of reengineering, so as to not offer direct competition with the sedan-only Audi 80 quattro. Syncro was also available in the American market, only with the five-cylinder engine.

IRVW II
The IRVW II is a modified Passat B2 from 1980. It was built for research on fuel economy in automobiles.

1985 Facelift
In January 1985 the range received a facelift with revised bumpers, interior, and front grille. The hatchbacks versions also received a new rear design, with broad and slim taillights replacing the earlier tall and skinny units. It also has a small integrated spoiler at the rear, and a flush-mounted rear windshield for lower wind resistance and a less cluttered appearance. The three-door hatchback was discontinued while the separate Santana nameplate was dropped in Europe. The saloon's name as well as the front end were now the same as the hatchback and estate, and the small price increase for the sedan was eliminated. The Passat GT was a new model, available as a liftback or station wagon. The Variant was now also available with the smallest 1.3-liter engine.

The Passat Variant Syncro, after a few months in production in the pre-facelift design, was also updated along with the rest of the line. Its equipment and appearance was now aligned with the GT trim, including the alloy wheels. All five-cylinder Passats received power steering as standard equipment, to minimize the effects of this engine's greater weight. Equipment levels were increased somewhat but were still spartan, even by the standard of the time. The mid-level Passat CL only now received indicator lights for the parking brake and brake fluid level, but these were still not installed in the Passat C. In August 1985 a catalyzed version of the 2.2-liter five-cylinder Syncro was introduced, producing . In January 1986 the Syncro programme was further expanded with a C model, fitted with the catalyzed  1.8-liter inline-four engine.

On 31 March 1988 production ended (although Syncro models continued in production until June) with 3,345,248 built in Germany. World production totaled approximately 4.5 million units.

Quantum (United States)
In the United States (this generation was not sold in Canada), the Passat/Santana was marketed as the Volkswagen Quantum beginning with the 1982 model year. The federalized model was, as is typical, fitted with much larger bumpers and sealed beam headlights as well as side marker lights. Various emission controls also added to the cars' overall weight. The Quantum was available in three-door hatchback (marketed as a "Coupe" and accordingly fitted with a rear spoiler), four-door Sedan, and Wagon forms. The five-door hatchback was never marketed in the US and the three-door hatchback was dropped after less than two years. There was a standard model and an available GL option, which added power windows, locks, and mirrors, as well as rear headrests, cruise control, and other extras. The 2.1-liter five-cylinder engine was introduced for 1983 as the Quantum GL-5. The Syncro station wagon was only offered with this engine.

The original engine used in the Quantum was the 1.7-liter inline-four also used in many other Volkswagens and Audis (as well as the Dodge Omni/Plymouth Horizon); there was no diesel option at first. The fuel injected 1.7 produces  at 5,000 rpm and was coupled to the high-geared 4+E transmission or to a three-speed automatic. While extremely fuel efficient at steady highway speeds, the tall gearing meant the somewhat underpowered engine had to work hard in most American conditions and real world fuel economy was not impressive in period tests. This changed with the 1983 model year, when the 2.1-liter, five-cylinder GL-5 version was added to the lineup (displacing 2144 cc, this was usually referred to as a "2.2" in Volkswagen's promotional material). The turbodiesel engine was mentioned as soon to be introduced in the 1983 catalog, but it would not go on sale for about two more years. For 1986, only the five-cylinder Quantum GL sedan remained available. For 1987 the Quantum received European-style composite headlamps and the wagon made a comeback, now equipped as the GL Sedan but also available with the Syncro all-wheel drive system. The lineup remained unchanged for 1988, the Quantum's final year on sale.

Engines

Petrol

Diesel

References

External links

Passat B2
Sedans
Hatchbacks
Station wagons
Cars introduced in 1981
1990s cars
2000s cars
2010s cars
Cars discontinued in 2013